The London Double Header ran between 2004 and 2017 and typically opened the season of Premiership Rugby (currently known as the Gallagher Premiership due to sponsorship), the top rugby union league in England.

Two games were played consecutively at Twickenham Stadium, originally involving the 'big four' London origin teams of the Premiership, Harlequins, London Irish, Saracens and Wasps (London Wasps until the 2014–15 season). Harlequins were relegated from the premiership at the end of the 2004–05 season and thus for the 2005–06 season Leeds Tykes were included instead. The same applied to London Irish in 2016 who were replaced. The matches form part of the regular season fixtures, with one team nominated as the home side for each match. Since 2008 (2016 being an exception) and the inception of The Big Game, Harlequins only compete in the double-header as an away side in order to reduce the number of home games they play away from Twickenham Stoop.

From 2015 and following Wasps' relocation to Coventry, the direction of the series changed. Two London teams (normally London Irish and Saracens) acted as the hosts, with the away teams being any of the other 10 Premiership Rugby teams. In 2016, Harlequins hosted due to London Irish's relegation from the premiership. In 2015, 2016 and 2017 the series featured a newly promoted team. The Double Header did not take place in 2018 due to redevelopment works at Twickenham Stadium and has not returned.

At other times of year Twickenham is also used for regular season Premiership fixtures, such as The Big Game hosted by Harlequins at Christmas time, The Clash hosted by Bath and the Premiership Final in June, as well as international fixtures including those by the Barbarians, plus inter-armed forces and varsity matches.

2004

2005

2006

2007

2008

2009

2010

2011

2012

2013

2014

2015

The 2015 London Double Header was moved from its traditional Round 1 position, to Round 5, in order to accommodate the 2015 Rugby World Cup knock-out stage matches being played at Twickenham Stadium. It was also the first time since 2005 that Saracens, Harlequins, London Irish and Wasps have not all taken part in the event. Harlequins chose not to take part due to the proximity of The Big Game 8 and were therefore replaced by Worcester Warriors. There had been suggestions that Wasps would not take part, following their move to the Ricoh Arena, however they were announced as one of the away teams for the event at the fixture launch on 3 July 2015.

2016

The 2016 London Double Header returned to its traditional Round 1 position. London Irish had been relegated from the Premiership and therefore did not take part. Home teams were confirmed on 28 June, with away teams confirmed at fixture launch on 7 July.

2017

The 2017 London Double Header took place in its traditional Round 1 position. London Irish return after being promoted back into the Premiership. Home teams were confirmed on 22 June, with the away teams confirmed at the Premiership fixture launch on 7 July.

References

External links
 Official site

Premiership Rugby
Rugby union in London